Minister of National Defence for Air (Canada) was the minister responsible for the Royal Canadian Air Force during World War II. post created by the 1940 War Measures Act. The act specifically amended the National Defence Act of 1923. 

The post was merged into the current post of the Minister of National Defence (Canada) in 1946.

List of ministers
 Charles Gavan Power 1940–1945
 Angus Lewis Macdonald  1944–1945 acting
 Colin William George Gibson 1945 acting
 Colin William George Gibson 1945–1946

Ministers with military experience

Gibson was Lieutenant Colonel of the Royal Hamilton Light Infantry and later Commandant of the Hamilton Garrison.

Both Macdonald, who was a Lieutenant and Power served as Captain and Acting Major with the Canadian Expeditionary Force in the army during World War I.

See also

 Minister of Militia and Defence
 Minister of the Naval Service
 Minister of National Defence
 Minister of Aviation
 Minister of National Defence for Naval Services
 Minister of Overseas Military Forces

Canadian military aviation
National Defence